Senator Pappas may refer to:

Sandy Pappas (born 1949), Minnesota State Senate
Stephan Pappas (born 1950), Wyoming State Senate